Cinderella Sanyu (professionally known as Cindy or Cindy Sanyu) is a Ugandan musician. She was one of the original members of Blu*3 which also consisted of Lilian Mbabazi and Jackie Chandiru. She has performed with P-Square, Wahu, Beenie Man, Ne-Yo, Tiwa savage , Bobi Wine, Shaggy, Chameleon, Bebe Cool, Davido, Mr. G and Radio & Weasel.

Early life and education
Cindy was born on 28 August 1985 in Kampala, Uganda but hails from Mbale district.

Music
Cindy started singing when she was 6 in her local church at a small town called Ntinda. She took part in "Capital Radio All Stars talent search" when she was 16 years old. She took third place. She worked with producer Steve Jean who made sure she participated in the "Coca-Cola Pop Stars" contest, which led to the formation of Blu*3 in 2003. With Blu*3, Cindy found music success winning the Best Artist/Group from Uganda & Best Music Video from Uganda in the 2005 Kisima Music Awards, Video of the Year ("Hitaji") in the 2005 Pearl of Africa Music Awards - and Video of the Year ("Burrn") in the 2007 Pearl of Africa Music Awards and getting nominated for best East African Group in the 2005 Kora Awards, Best East African Album (Hitaji) in the 2005 Tanzania Music Awards- Best East African video ("Frisky") in the 2006 Channel O Music Video Awards, Best Group & Best Performer in the 2009 MTV Africa Music Awards and Best East African Song ('Where you are' with Radio & Weasel) in the 2010 Tanzania music awards.

Cindy was dropped from the group and, in 2008, she embarked on a solo career. Her debu solo album 'Ayokyayokya'(2009) topped charts all over East Africa with hits like "Mbikooye" and "Nawewe", "Ayokyayokya", and "One and Only". She has had more successful songs like "Selekta".

Acting
Cindy got her debut film acting role in a Ugandan musical drama film Bella in which she played Bella in a lead role. Her performance earned her nominations at the Africa Movie Academy Awards for Best Young Actor, Africa Lead Role In Film (Non Nigerian) at the Nigeria Entertainment Awards and Best Actress at Uganda Film Festival Awards, all in 2018. She later worked on another film November Tear that was released in 2019.

Personal life 
Cinderella Sanyu was in a relationship with Mario Brunetti and the relationship produced a daughter, Amani.
She got engaged to actor, producer and film director Joel Okuyo Prynce in March 2020 in Kampala. She got married to Joel Okuyo Prynce on 11th December 2021. She had her first child for him and she is expecting a second child for him soon.

Leadership roles
Cindy is currently the Acting President of the Uganda Musicians’ Association (UMA) after the resignation Ykee Benda as his deputy, Cindy stepped forward and filled the president’s shoes.

Controversy 
Cinderella Sanyu was involved in a relationship with Ken Muyisa. On leaving Blu*3, her fellow band members, Jackie Chandiru and Lillian Mbabazi claimed that "she was not candid" about her reasons for leaving. It was not long till Cindy embarked on a solo career with her hit single Mbikooye and wrote more hits like Ayokyayokya, Amateeka, Party, Selecta, Ndi mukodo, Run this city etc.

Discography

Songs
Mbikoye
Amateeka
One and only
Party
Total satisfaction
Nawewe
Selekta
Tempo remix
Ndi mukodo
Samodat
Dat dat
Run this city
One by one ft Skales
Dancehall ft Eddy Kenzo
Onnina
Faded
Copicat
Boom party

Albums
The King Herself, 2019
Ayokyayokya, 2009

Awards and recognition
Female artiste of the year in the DIVA awards, 2009
Teenies' dancehall artiste in Buzz teenies awards, 2010
Best female artiste of the year in Buzz teenies awards, 2010
Afrima awards best female artiste (East Africa) 2016
Bingwa awards best artiste from Uganda 2016

References 

https://twitter.com/blizzug/status/795372478373785600 Cindy sanyu Afrima award winner best Female artiste East Africa 2019
https://twitter.com/Mdundomusic/status/694593397022146562 Artiste of the year Uganda.

1985 births
Musicians from Kampala
21st-century Ugandan women singers
Living people
Kumusha